Bakari Seleman (born 5 June 1955) is a Tanzanian boxer. He competed in the men's light flyweight event at the 1972 Summer Olympics. Seleman also represented Tanzania at the 1974 British Commonwealth Games.

References

1955 births
Living people
Tanzanian male boxers
Olympic boxers of Tanzania
Boxers at the 1972 Summer Olympics
Commonwealth Games competitors for Tanzania
Boxers at the 1974 British Commonwealth Games
Place of birth missing (living people)
Light-flyweight boxers